Margi Ein (born 8 December 1950 in Põltsamaa) is an Estonian politician and engineer. She has been member of X Riigikogu.

In 1993, she was elected Deputy Mayor of Põltsamaa. From 1996 until 2003 she was the Mayor of Põltsamaa. She was a member of People's Union of Estonia party.

References

1950 births
Living people
People's Union of Estonia politicians
Members of the Riigikogu, 2003–2007
Women members of the Riigikogu
Women mayors of places in Estonia
Tallinn University of Technology alumni
People from Põltsamaa
21st-century Estonian women politicians